Carnival is an album by American jazz saxophonist John Handy which was recorded in 1977 and originally released on the ABC/Impulse label.

Reception

AllMusic awarded the album 2 stars stating "Handy is mostly featured here in commercial settings, singing two songs and interacting with an electric rhythm section".

Track listing
All compositions by John Handy except as indicated
 "Carnival" – 3:25
 "Alvina" – 6:11
 "Watch Your Money Go" – 5:58
 "I Will Leave You" – 5:15
 "Love's Rejoycing" – 8:17
 "Make Her Mine" – 4:10
 "All the Things You Are" (Jerome Kern, Oscar Hammerstein II) – 2:43
 "Christina's Little Song" – 6:05

Personnel 
John Handy – alto saxophone, percussion, vocals, backing vocals
Sonny Burke – keyboards, piano, synthesizer (tracks 1, 2, 4, 5 & 7)
Lee Ritenour – guitar, keyboards, synthesizer (tracks 1, 6 & 8)
George Spencer – keyboards (track 3)  
Larry Carlton (track 5), Mike Hoffmann (tracks 2–4) – guitar
Rudy Coleman (tracks 1–4) James Jamerson (track 5) Vincent Jefferson (tracks 6 & 8) – bass
James Gadson (tracks 1, 3 & 5), John Handy IV (tracks 2 & 4), Harold Jones (tracks 6 & 8) – drums
Eddie "Bongo" Brown (tracks 1 & 5), Paulinho da Costa (tracks 6 & 8), Tom Nicholas (tracks 2–4) – congas
Esmond Edwards – percussion, backing vocals (tracks 1, 4, 5 & 6) 
Unidentified backing vocals (tracks 1 & 3)

References 

1977 albums
John Handy albums
Impulse! Records albums
Albums produced by Esmond Edwards